Charles Parry may refer to:
Charles Christopher Parry (1823–1890), British-American botanist and mountaineer
Sir Charles Hubert Parry (1848–1918), English composer
Charles de Courcy Parry (died 1948), British Chief Constable
Charlie Parry (1870–1922), Welsh footballer with Everton F. C.
Charles Henry Parry (1779–1860), English physician and writer